Independence Historic District, also known as the West Franklin Street-Wabash Avenue Historic District, is a national historic district located in the Lamasco neighborhood of Evansville, Indiana.  The district developed after 1880, and encompasses 95 contributing buildings and 1 contributing site.  It includes commercial and residential properties and representative examples of Italianate, Queen Anne, Romanesque, and Beaux-Arts style architecture.  Notable buildings include the West Branch Carnegie Library (1912), Laval Block, Heldt-Voelker Hardware Store (1890), First Federal Savings, Gerke Building, August Rosenberger House (1894), and St. Boniface Church (1882, 1902).

It was listed on the National Register of Historic Places in 1982.

References

Historic districts on the National Register of Historic Places in Indiana
Queen Anne architecture in Indiana
Italianate architecture in Indiana
Romanesque Revival architecture in Indiana
Beaux-Arts architecture in Indiana
Geography of Evansville, Indiana
Historic districts in Evansville, Indiana
National Register of Historic Places in Evansville, Indiana